Darya Alexandrovna Mitina is a Russian leftist politician, historian, and cinema critic. She was born on August 14, 1973 in Moscow. Her mother, Natalia Mitina, was a known Soviet cinema scenario writer, and her father, Kasem Iskander Ibrahim Mohammed Yusufzai, was the founder of an Afghanistan national TV network. Her grandfather, Mohammed Yusuf, was the Prime Minister of Afghanistan from 1963 to 1965. She is married to Said Gafurov. She graduated as a historian and ethnologist from the Faculty of History of the Moscow State University in 1995
.

Political activity 
Since 2014 she has been a Secretary responsible for International affairs of the Party  and member of the Political commission of the United Communist Party (Russia).

She was a deputy of the State Duma for the second convocation (1995-1999). During the 2016 State Duma elections she was a candidate from the "Communist Party "Communists of Russia"" at the Cheremushkinskiy election district but did not succeed.

She is the First Secretary of the Central Committee of the Russian Communist Youth League (Komsomol), and she was one of its founders in 1993.

In May–August 2014 Mitina was the Representative of the Ministry of Foreign Affairs of the Donetsk People's Republic in Moscow.

References

External links 
kolobok1973 blog by Darya Mitina 

Russian Marxists
1973 births
Living people
Russian communists
Russian people of Afghan descent
Moscow State University alumni
Russian opinion journalists
Second convocation members of the State Duma (Russian Federation)